The White Monuments of Vladimir and Suzdal in Russia have been designated as a UNESCO World Heritage Site. The patrimony embraces eight medieval limestone monuments of Zalesye from the late 12th and early 13th centuries. They include Russian Orthodox churches and a monastery, as well as a castle and gate:

World Heritage Sites in Russia
Buildings and structures in Vladimir Oblast
Tourist attractions in Vladimir Oblast